The Cyprus military ranks are the military insignia used by the Cypriot National Guard. Due to its close ties to Greece, Cyprus shares a rank structure similar to that of Greece.

Commissioned officer ranks
The rank insignia of commissioned officers.

Other ranks
The rank insignia of non-commissioned officers and enlisted personnel.

References

External links
 
 

Cyprus
Military of Cyprus